Jesus rock may refer to:

Christian rock
Contemporary Christian music
Jesus music